Proditrix gahniae is a species of moth in the family Glyphipterigidae first described by John S. Dugdale in 1987. It is endemic to New Zealand.

References

Moths described in 1987
Moths of New Zealand
Plutellidae
Endemic fauna of New Zealand
Endemic moths of New Zealand